William II of Agen (also known as  Guillaume d'Agen) was the Latin Patriarch of Jerusalem in 1261–70.  Among other things, he was tasked by Pope Urban IV in 1263 by the papal bull Exultavit cor nostrum to investigate the legitimacy of an alleged ambassador with the Mongol Empire, John the Hungarian.

References
 Peter Jackson, Mongols and the West, p. 166

 
 

Latin Patriarchs of Jerusalem
Year of birth missing

Year of death missing
13th-century people of the Kingdom of Jerusalem